Steven R. Rosefielde (born 1942) is professor of comparative economic systems at the University of North Carolina at Chapel Hill. He is also a member of the Russian Academy of Natural Sciences.

Red Holocaust 
In Red Holocaust, Rosefielde's main point is that communism in general, although he focuses mostly on Stalinism, is less genocidal, and that is a key distinction from Nazism. According to German historian , the term is not popular among scholars in Germany or internationally. Alexandra Laignel-Lavastine writes that usage of this term "allows the reality it describes to immediately attain, in the Western mind, a status equal to that of the extermination of the Jews by the Nazi regime." Michael Shafir writes that the use of the term supports the "competitive martyrdom component of Double Genocide", a theory whose worst version is Holocaust obfuscation. George Voicu states that Leon Volovici has "rightfully condemned the abusive use of this concept as an attempt to 'usurp' and undermine a symbol specific to the history of European Jews."

Definition and analysis 
Rosefielde defined the "Red Holocaust" as including "all murders (judicially sanctioned terror-executions), criminal manslaughter (lethal forced labor and ethnic cleansing) and felonious negligent homicide (terror-starvation) incurred from insurrectionary actions and civil wars prior to state seizure, and all subsequent felonious state killings. This treatise, however, limits the Red Holocaust death toll to peacetime state killings, even if communists were responsible for political assassinations, insurrections and civil wars before achieving power, in order to highlight the causal significance of communist economic systems. It also excludes deaths attributable to wartime hostilities after states were founded."

About the "Red Holocaust", Rosefielde made some notes about the definition used and what is included, commenting: "As a matter of accounting, the convention excludes Soviet killings before 1929, during World War II (1940–45) and in Germany, occupied Europe, North Korea, Manchuria and the Kuril Islands (1946–53). Killings in China before October 1949 are similarly excluded, as are those in Indochina before 1954. Soviet slaughter of nobles, kulaks, capitalist and the bourgeoisie during War Communism are part of the excluded wartime group, but killings of similar social categories in China, North Korea, Vietnam, Laos and Cambodia after their civil wars in the process of Communist consolidation are included. The summary casualty statistics reported in Table 11.1 conform with this definition and in principle only reflect excess deaths, excluding natural mortality. It provides a comprehensive picture of discretionary communist killings unobscured by wartime exigencies. Others desiring a broader body count to assess the fullest extent of communist carnage can easily supplement the estimates provided here from standard sources."

According to Rosefielde, "[t]he story that emerges from the exercise is edifying. It reveals that the conditions for the Red Holocaust were rooted in Stalin's, Kim's, Mao's, Ho's and Pol Pot's siege-mobilized terror-command economic systems, not in Marx's utopian vision or other pragmatic communist transition mechanisms. Terror-command was chosen among other reasons because of legitimate fears about the long-term viability of terror-free command, and the ideological risks of market communism. The internal contradictions of communism confronted leaders with a predicament that could only have been efficiently resolved by acknowledging communism's inferiority and changing course. Denial offered two unhappy options: one bloody, the other dreary, and history records that more often than not, communist rulers chose the worst option. Tens of millions were killed in vain; a testament to the triumph of ruthless hope over dispassionate reason that proved more durable than Hitler's and Hirohito's racism. These findings are likely to withstand the test of time, but are only a beginning, opening up a vast new field for scientific inquiry as scholars gradually gain access to archives in North Korea, China, Vietnam, Laos and Cambodia."

Estimates 
Rosefielde posited that communist rulers had to choose between changing course and "terror-command" and more often than not chose the latter. Rosefielde referred to a "Red Holocaust" for "peacetime state killings" under communist regimes while stating that it "could be defined to include all murders (judicially sanctioned terror-executions), criminal manslaughter (lethal forced labor and ethnic cleansing) and felonious negligent homicide (terror-starvation) incurred from insurrectionary actions and civil wars prior to state seizure, and all subsequent felonious state killings." Rosefielde wrote that "[w]e now know as well beyond a reasonable doubt that there were more than 13 million Red Holocaust victims 1929–53, and this figure could rise above 20 million." Rosefielde posited that Communism's internal contradictions caused the democide of "approximately 60 million people and perhaps tens of millions more."

Rosefielde said that the number of 1,053,829 people who died in the Gulag from 1934 to 1953, according to a 1993 archive data study by J. Arch Getty et al., has to be augmented by 19.4 percent in light of more complete archival evidence to 1,258,537, with the best estimate of Gulag deaths being 1.6 million from 1929 to 1953 when excess mortality is taken into account. Rosefielde wrote that Democratic Kampuchea was the deadliest of all Communist regimes on a per capita basis, primarily because it "lacked a viable productive core" and it "failed to set boundaries on mass murder." Rosefielde has described the North Korean famine which claimed as many as one million lives as the result of the economic policies of the North Korean government and deliberate "terror-starvation." According to Rosefielde, this "still persists in North Korea", as Kim Jong-il "refuses to abandon mass killing."

Work, reviews and citations 
In a 2001 study, Rosefielde calculated that there were 3.4 million premature deaths in Russia from 1990 to 1998, partly blaming on the shock therapy that came with the Washington Consensus. Rosefielde's work has been reviewed in peer-reviewed journals. Russia since 1980: Wrestling with Westernization was reviewed by David G. Rowley in History: Reviews of New Books. Red Holocaust was reviewed by Martin Kragh in Scandinavian Economic History Review. As of 2020, "Measuring Enterprise Efficiency in the Soviet Union: A Stochastic Frontier Analysis" has been cited 82 times.

Selected works 
 
 Russia since 1980: Wrestling with Westernization, with Stefan Hedlund, Cambridge University Press, 2009
 Red Holocaust, Routledge, 2009
 Economic Welfare and the Economics of Soviet Socialism: Essays in Honor of Abram Bergson, Cambridge University Press, 2008
 The Russian Economy: From Lenin to Putin, Wiley-Blackwell, 2007
 Masters of Illusion: American Leadership In The Media Age, Cambridge University Press, 2006
 Comparative Economic Systems: Culture, Wealth, and Power in the 21st Century, Wiley-Blackwell, 2002, 2005, 2008
 Russia in the 21st Century: The Prodigal Superpower, Cambridge University Press, 2004
 Premature Deaths: Russia's Radical Economic Transition in Soviet Perspective,  Europe-Asia Studies (2001). 53 (8): 1159–1176. .
 Efficiency and Russia's Economic Recovery Potential to the Year 2000 and Beyond, ed., Ashgate Publishing, 1998
 Documented Homicides and Excess Deaths: New Insights into the Scale of Killing in the USSR during the 1930s. (PDF file) Communist and Post-Communist Studies, Vol. 30, No. 3, pp. 321–333. University of California, 1997.
 False Science: Underestimating the Soviet Arms Buildup. An Appraisal of the CIA's Direct Costing Effort, 1960–1985, 1988
 World Communism at the Crossroads: Military Ascendancy, Political Economy, and Human Welfare, 1980
 Soviet International Trade in Heckscher-Ohlin Perspective: An Input-Output Study, 1973

References 

1942 births
21st-century American economists
Living people
Harvard University alumni
Place of birth missing (living people)
University of North Carolina at Chapel Hill faculty